George Smith (1868 – after 1890) was an English professional footballer who played in the Football Alliance for Small Heath. Smith, who was born in Birmingham, played his only league game for the club on 31 March 1891 in a 4–0 defeat at Sunderland Albion; he only played because regular left half Ted Devey missed the train.

References

1868 births
Year of death missing
Footballers from Birmingham, West Midlands
English footballers
Association football wing halves
Birmingham City F.C. players
Football Alliance players
Date of birth missing
Place of death missing